Faà di Bruno's formula is an identity in mathematics generalizing the chain rule to higher derivatives. It is named after , although he was not the first to state or prove the formula. In 1800, more than 50 years before Faà di Bruno, the French mathematician Louis François Antoine Arbogast had stated the formula in a calculus textbook, which is considered to be the first published reference on the subject.

Perhaps the most well-known form of Faà di Bruno's formula says that

where the sum is over all n-tuples of nonnegative integers (m1, ..., mn) satisfying the constraint

Sometimes, to give it a memorable pattern, it is written in a way in which the coefficients that have the combinatorial interpretation discussed below are less explicit:

Combining the terms with the same value of m1 + m2 + ... + mn = k and noticing that mj has to be zero for j > n − k + 1 leads to a somewhat simpler formula expressed in terms of Bell polynomials Bn,k(x1,...,xn−k+1):

Combinatorial form 

The formula has a "combinatorial" form:

where

  runs through the set Π of all partitions of the set { 1, ..., n },
"B ∈ " means the variable B runs through the list of all of the "blocks" of the partition , and
|A| denotes the cardinality of the set A (so that || is the number of blocks in the partition  and |B| is the size of the block B).

Example
The following is a concrete explanation of the combinatorial form for the  case.

The pattern is:

The factor  corresponds to the partition 2 + 1 + 1 of the integer 4, in the obvious way.  The factor  that goes with it corresponds to the fact that there are three summands in that partition.  The coefficient 6 that goes with those factors corresponds to the fact that there are exactly six partitions of a set of four members that break it into one part of size 2 and two parts of size 1.

Similarly, the factor  in the third line corresponds to the partition 2 + 2 of the integer 4, (4, because we are finding the fourth derivative), while  corresponds to the fact that there are two summands (2 + 2) in that partition. The coefficient 3 corresponds to the fact that there are  ways of partitioning 4 objects into groups of 2. The same concept applies to the others.

A memorizable scheme is as follows:

Combinatorics of the Faà di Bruno coefficients

These partition-counting Faà di Bruno coefficients have a "closed-form" expression.  The number of partitions of a set of size n corresponding to the integer partition

of the integer n is equal to

These coefficients also arise in the Bell polynomials, which are relevant to the study of cumulants.

Variations

Multivariate version

Let y = g(x1, ..., xn). Then the following identity holds regardless of whether the n variables are all distinct, or all identical, or partitioned into several distinguishable classes of indistinguishable variables (if it seems opaque, see the very concrete example below):

where (as above)

  runs through the set Π of all partitions of the set { 1, ..., n },
"B ∈ " means the variable B runs through the list of all of the "blocks" of the partition , and
|A| denotes the cardinality of the set A (so that || is the number of blocks in the partition  and |B| is the size of the block B).

More general versions hold for cases where the all functions are vector- and even Banach-space-valued. In this case one needs to consider the Fréchet derivative or Gateaux derivative.

 Example

The five terms in the following expression correspond in the obvious way to the five partitions of the set { 1, 2, 3 }, and in each case the order of the derivative of f is the number of parts in the partition:

If the three variables are indistinguishable from each other, then three of the five terms above are also indistinguishable from each other, and then we have the classic one-variable formula.

Formal power series version
Suppose 
and 

Then the composition  is again a formal power series,

where c0 = a0 and the other coefficient cn for n ≥ 1 
can be expressed as a sum over compositions of n or as an equivalent sum over partitions of n:

where 

is the set of compositions of n with k denoting the number of parts,

or

where

is the set of partitions of n into k parts, in frequency-of-parts form.

The first form is obtained by picking out the  coefficient of xn
in  "by inspection", and the second form
is then obtained by collecting like terms, or alternatively, by applying the multinomial theorem.

The special case f(x) = ex, g(x) = Σn ≥ 1 an /n! xn gives the exponential formula.
The special case f(x) = 1/(1 − x), g(x) = Σn ≥ 1 (−an) xn gives an expression for the reciprocal of the formal power series Σn ≥ 0 an xn in the case a0 = 1.

Stanley 
gives a version for exponential power series.
In the formal power series

we have the nth derivative at 0:

This should not be construed as the value of a function, since these series are purely formal; there is no such thing as convergence or divergence in this context.

If

and

and

then the coefficient cn (which would be the nth derivative of h evaluated at 0 if we were dealing with convergent series rather than formal power series) is given by

where  runs through the set of all partitions of the set {1, ..., n} and B1, ..., Bk are the blocks of the partition , and | Bj | is the number of members of the jth block, for j = 1, ..., k.

This version of the formula is particularly well suited to the purposes of combinatorics.

We can also write with respect to the notation above

where Bn,k(a1,...,an−k+1) are Bell polynomials.

A special case

If f(x) = ex, then all of the derivatives of f are the same and are a factor common to every term:  

where  is the nth complete exponential Bell polynomial.

In case g(x) is a cumulant-generating function, then f(g(x)) is a moment-generating function, and the polynomial in various derivatives of g is the polynomial that expresses the moments as functions of the cumulants.

See also

Notes

References

Historical surveys and essays
. "The mathematical work" is an essay on the mathematical activity, describing both the research and teaching activity of Francesco Faà di Bruno.
.
.

Research works
, Entirely freely available from Google books.
. Entirely freely available from Google books. A well-known paper where Francesco Faà di Bruno presents the two versions of the formula that now bears his name, published in the journal founded by Barnaba Tortolini.
. Entirely freely available from Google books.
. Entirely freely available from Google books.
 Flanders, Harley (2001) "From Ford to Faa", American Mathematical Monthly  108(6): 558–61 
.

.
, available at NUMDAM.
, available at NUMDAM.

External links
 

Differentiation rules
Differential calculus
Differential algebra
Enumerative combinatorics
Factorial and binomial topics
Theorems in analysis